Omar El Hilali (born 12 September 2003) is a Moroccan professional footballer who plays as a right-back for RCD Espanyol B.

Club career
Born in L'Hospitalet de Llobregat, Barcelona, Catalonia, El Hilali joined RCD Espanyol's youth setup at the age of 13, from hometown side CF Santa Eulàlia. He made his senior debut with the reserves on 18 October 2020, starting in a 2–1 Segunda División B home win against AE Prat.

El Hilali made his first-team debut at the age of just 17 on 4 April 2021, coming on as a second-half substitute for injured Óscar Gil in a 3–0 away success over Albacete Balompié in the Segunda División.

International career
El Hilali was born in Spain to a Moroccan family, with roots in Tangier. He represented the Morocco U20s at the 2021 Africa U-20 Cup of Nations.

References

External links
 
 
 

2003 births
Living people
Footballers from L'Hospitalet de Llobregat
Spanish sportspeople of Moroccan descent
Moroccan footballers
Spanish footballers
Association football fullbacks
Segunda División players
Segunda División B players
Segunda Federación players
RCD Espanyol B footballers
RCD Espanyol footballers
Morocco youth international footballers